
Restaurant De Oude Geleerde Man is a defunct restaurant in Bennebroek, in the Netherlands. It was a fine dining restaurant that was awarded one Michelin star in 1980 and retained that rating until 1990. The restaurant closed down shortly after 1991.

In 1970, Arie Siliakus became the owner. In 1990 he sold the restaurant to buy De Hoop op d’Swarte Walvis. In the period 1981-1986 Jean Jacques Menanteau was head chef.

Since 2009, a Chinese-Japanese restaurant is housed on the former location of De Oude Geleerde Man. This continues a tradition as a stopping point and restaurant at this address since 1683.

De Oude Geleerde Man is subject of the poem Lofzang aan de Oude Geleerde Man by Gerrit van Lennep (1774-1833).

See also
List of Michelin starred restaurants in the Netherlands

References

External links
 Photo restaurant ± 1931
 Interior restaurant 1989 with unnamed people, likely to be the head chef and the owner.

Restaurants in the Netherlands
Michelin Guide starred restaurants in the Netherlands
Defunct restaurants in the Netherlands